's may refer to:

 's, an ending used to form the possessive of English nouns and noun phrases
 's, a contraction of the English words is and has
 's, a form of the English plural ending, written after single letters and in some other instances (see also Greengrocers' apostrophes)
 's, a contraction of the old Dutch genitive article des, appearing in names such as 's-Hertogenbosch

See also
 All pages beginning with 's
 All pages beginning with 'S
 Apostrophe
 -s (disambiguation)
 S (disambiguation)